Brennåsen is a village in Kristiansand municipality in Agder county, Norway. The European route E39 highway passes through Brennåsen as it travels between the cities of Kristiansand and Stavanger. The village was part of Songdalen municipality prior to 2020 when that municipality was dissolved.

The village has a shopping centre, post office, school, and gas station.

References

Villages in Agder
Geography of Kristiansand